Thangam is a 2008 Tamil action film starring Sathyaraj and Goundamani about the life of a village do-gooder in Tamil Nadu.

Plot
Set in a small town near Coimbatore, 'Thangam' portrays tw families headed by Rajendranath and Mahadevan respectively. Thangam (Sathyaraj) is the son of Delhi Kumar and Aaruchami (Shanmugaraj) is the son of Mahadevan. Kaalai (Goundamani) is the uncle of Thangam.

Thangam and his sister Bhagyalakshmi (Jayashree) share a special attachment. The sister finds a suitable girl (Megha Nair) for the brother, who tries hard to arrange her marriage in a grand manner.

The two families turn foes because of the local MLA, who is corrupt. The MLA wants to get rid of Rajendranath, who commands respect in the constituency. He gets close to Aaruchami, who is jealous of the respect commanded by Thangam and his family.

The story has many twists and turns. Aaruchami, a compulsive womanizer, woo Thangam's sister and makes her pregnant. Thangam, who is mad of his sister, makes Aaruchami marry him. Aaruchami commits a murder but Thangam accepts the responsibility and go to the jail to save Aaruchami, to make the marriage of his sister possible.

Later, the relationship between the families is affected further with Mahadevan revolts against Rajendranath to make his son Aaruchami as MLA. In the process, he commits a murder and gets punished.

The battle gets worsened. Rajendranath and Bhagyalakshmi are killed. The rest of the story narrates how Thangam avenges for the murders.

Cast
Sathyaraj as Thangam
Meghna Nair
Goundamani as Kaalai 
Jayasree as Bhagyalakshmi 
Mahadevan
Delhi Kumar
Shanmugaraj as Aaruchami

Soundtrack
Soundtrack was composed by Srikanth Deva, with lyrics written by Yugabharathi.
"Othakathu" - Karthik, Saindhavi
"Rathathula" - Manikka Vinayagam
"Pattukara" - Chinmayi
"Chinna Chinna" - Senthildas, Surmukhi Raman
"Solran" - Priyadarshini

Reception
Sify wrote "The story is as old as the hills, presentation in mass masala format that works in B & C centers. Kicha makes no bones about it that he is playing to the galleries and uses the tested formula that was a winning factor in the 80's - Annan-Thankachi Pasum (brother-sister sentiments), comedy and action". Behindwoods wrote "Thangam proves that the old Kollywood formula of masala stirred together with those old, oppressive patriarchal sentiments doesn’t glitter anymore". Indiaglitz wrote "Overall, the movie has nothing new or novel to offer. But it does entertain with a good script and comedy element".

References

2008 films
Indian action drama films
2000s Tamil-language films
Films scored by Srikanth Deva
2008 action drama films